Jenna Hamilton is a fictional character from the teen comedy-drama television series Awkward., which aired on MTV in the United States. The character was created by series' producer Lauren Iungerich, and is portrayed by  Ashley Rickards. She is the series' protagonist and also serves as the narrator.

Storylines
Jenna P. Hamilton is an eighteen-year-old high school student. She is the daughter of Lacey and Kevin Hamilton, who had Jenna when they were seventeen, and it's specified that when Lacey's pregnancy got uncovered to Kevin's folks, they had an irate showdown with her, and to exacerbate the situation, this brought about Lacey’s hurling, yet it is obscure as to whether they've made up from that point forward. Jenna was conceived on December 2, 1995 in Los Angeles at 7:32 P.M. Since her folks had her at a youthful age, they are whimsical and humiliating towards Jenna, as they both endeavor to be her companion as opposed to a parent. She is best friends with Tamara and Ming Huang. She has her own blog, I am Jenna,  where she writes about whatever is going on in her life.

Season one
While working at a summer camp, Jenna loses her virginity to her longstanding crush Matty McKibben. While he does like her, Matty does not want to be seen with her so they date in secret. In the meantime, she receives an anonymous "carefrontation" letter about how she could disappear and no one would notice. This leads her to having an accident in her bathroom which appears as a suicide attempt. This situation makes Jenna infamous at her high school; being constantly referred to as "that girl," with varying crazy stories over how she tried to kill herself. She gets noticed by Matty's best friend, Jake Rosati. Little by little, they get to know each other and Jake eventually kisses her as he has developed feelings for her, though he already has a girlfriend. At the end of the first season, Jenna decides to go to the year's Formal with Jake, but only as friends, as she is still uncertain about Matty, who did not explicitly invite her. At the dance, she realizes that she can no longer wait for Matty (who she thinks is still undecided, but who now truly wants to commit) and starts a relationship with Jake. It is also revealed that it was her mother Lacey, who wrote the letter.

Season two
In the aftermath of the letter-revelation, Jenna refuses to talk to her mother until she tells the truth to her father. Jenna's mother finally admits it to her husband, which causes them to separate temporarily. Jenna's relationship with Jake goes smoothly until Matty tries to sabotage it. Becoming jealous of Matty's new girlfriend, Jenna questions her relationship with Jake. After Jake tells her he loves her, she considers making love with him as she thinks it might clarify her feelings for him. Jenna finally realizes she is in love with Jake, declaring her love for him in a voice mail while at Aunt Ally's wedding. However, after Sadie Saxton tells him about Matty and Jenna's past, he breaks up with her. Matty comes over to her house to comfort her and she admits she still has feelings for him. They passionately share a kiss, which is seen by Jake, who stood outside as he was on the point to make up with her. Jenna tries to fix things with Jake but he keeps ignoring her. He sends her a picture of her and Matty making out, showing that he now knows everything. She tries again several times to explain to him what happened but he says he cannot trust her anymore. In the meantime, Jake stops being friends with Matty and the two get into a fight. Jenna decides to forward her blog to everyone so Jake can see the whole truth. The next day at school Jenna asks Jake if he read her blog and he tells her that she has humiliated him. However, after watching a film in French class, Jake and Matty decide to patch things up between them but they reveal to each other that they are both still in love with Jenna. They then tell Jenna that she has to pick between the pair. In deciding, Jenna imagines alternate scenes where she chooses one over another. She eventually chooses Matty but soon begins to have second thoughts as she decides to spend the summer with Matty while Jake will go to Europe with Tamara.

Season three
Jenna and Matty have been dating for over six months, and are about to start their junior year. She feels confused over whether she should have gone to Europe since her friends had all these new experiences without her, but Tamara, who is now officially dating Jake, assures her that they will always be best friends. Once school starts, Jenna is put into an advanced writing class run by Mr. Hart, who's known for being hard on his students. She initially tries to get out of the class, but Val convinces her that she needs to grow and try new things. It's revealed that the reason behind Jenna's new-found anxiety is that she might be pregnant after having unprotected sex with Matty one time during the summer. When it turns out to be a false alarm, her mother decides to help Jenna get on birth control, but warns her not to tell Matty about the pregnancy scare. She later tells Jake during Ricky Schwartz's vigil/keg party, which causes Matty to get upset and leave. She believes that Matty might break up with her when he tells her they need to talk. He instead explains that he felt jealous over how she can easily talk to Jake. Jenna explains that she is insecure sometimes about their relationship since Matty didn't want to be seen with her, but he assures her that he was never embarrassed by her. Jenna's father then discovers her birth-control pills, and calls Matty's parents to tell them that their children are having sex. This leads to an uncomfortable dinner between Jenna and Matty's families. While things seem to be going okay, Matty's mother ends up getting into a fight with Lacey over her decision to put Jenna on the pill. This causes Matty to get into a fight with his parents over how they treated Jenna's family. He temporarily stays at the Hamilton house. After being called out by Mr. Hart for not taking risks, Jenna decides to read an excerpt from her blog for an open-mic night. The reading goes well, and she ends up staying behind to hang out with Collin, a guy from her English class. Jenna begins to develop feeling for Collin, leading her to cheat on Matty. Jenna gets caught at her surprise party and she and Matty later break up. Jenna continues her relationship with Collin, which leads her into having sex with him just because she doesn't want to lose him, later smoking weed, and even getting ecstasy slipped into her drink by Collins ex- girlfriend. Jenna realizes she had hit rock bottom and wants to make up with her friends and family. Jenna breaks up with Collin and apologizes to everyone about her actions. Afterward, Jenna realizes that she still has feelings for Matty.

Season four

Season five

Casting
Ashley Rickards first received the script through her representatives and then met the series' creator. "I met with Lauren Iungerich and it all went really well and all worked out. I got to do the project, it got picked up and here we are." Speaking of what appealed to her about the show, she said:

Characterization
Rickards described her character as "smart, sarcastic, a little bit witty and very intuitive." She also said Jenna "can be the shy, introverted girl, whereas on her blog she's snarky, she's introspective, she's a little bit wiser, she'll write the truth… and then probably not act on it." Rickards called her a "role model" because "every time she gets kicked down, she gets back up fighting" while it is sometimes easier to give up.

Reception
The character, along with Rickards performance, was critically acclaimed and continues to be praised by critics. Daniel Fienberg of HitFix applauded Rickards' acting, writing that "she effectively embodies the Everygirl vibe required for the part. She's got good timing, decent physical comedy chops and there's no ego to this performance." New York Post TV critic Linda Stasi compared Rickards to actor Elliot Page, explaining she is "the kind of kid whose pretty face and adorable bearing is swamped by her ability to look awkward and offbeat." Hank Stuever of The Washington Post was also positive towards Rickards' performance noting "she effortlessly manages to elevate the unfresh premise of MTV's new comedy." AfterElton.com placed Rickards on their list of 2011's Break-Out TV Actors, explaining: "Rickards gives Jenna a doe-eyed innocence and covers the full range of teen emotions, from deer-in-the-headlights paranoia to sultry eyelash batting, sometimes in the same scene. While putting the show on their list of the best TV shows of 2011, The Daily Beast called Rickards "a total standout". Her performance on the show earned her in 2012 a Critics' Choice Television Award nomination for Best Actress in a Comedy Series and a nomination at the Teen Choice Awards for Summer TV Star: Female.

Entertainment Weekly wrote Jenna "navigates the sharky waters of high school, friends, mean cheerleaders, and cute boys with a snarky voice-over that makes her—and Awkward.—easy to fall in love with." The Huffington Post deemed Jenna's voice-overs "witty" as "[they] make this high-school dark comedy stand out from a crowd of stereotypical high school prime-time soaps." David Hinckley of the Daily News wrote: "If the dramas are exaggerated, Jenna makes the trauma feel legitimate, and her narration gives everything a knowing undertone of humor and self-awareness that keeps the most uncomfortable moments from being painful." Reviewing the beginning of the second season, HitFix Daniel Fienberg was critical of the Matty-Jenna-Jake triangle storyline which had been put forward, diminishing what he first liked: Jenna's look at the high school humiliations. He noted his indifference to Jenna's dilemma as "there's no jeopardy to either choice". "Whoever Jenna chooses is going to say almost nothing about her as a character, so it weakens the character that there's nothing else defining her at this moment", he wrote.

References

External links
Jenna Hamilton at MTV.com
 Jenna Hamilton on IMDb

Television characters introduced in 2011
Fictional characters from Los Angeles
Teenage characters in television